Jan Karol Wasiewicz (6 January 1911 – 9 November 1976) was an interwar Polish football player. Wasiewicz was a midfielder both in Pogoń Lwów (one of the best teams of interwar Poland), and the Polish National Team.

His career started in 1926 in another Lwów team – RKS. Then he moved to Lechia Lwów and in 1933 to Pogoń. In the last team, he played in the Polish Soccer League in the years 1933–1939, representing Pogoń in 102 games and scoring 3 goals. In the Polish National Team, Wasiewicz took part in 11 games, scoring 3 goals. He was part of Poland's squad for the 1936 Summer Olympics. He was also a reserve team player during the 1938 FIFA World Cup, but did not go to France. Most probably, he would have played in the legendary game Poland – Brazil 5-6 (5 June 1938, Strasbourg, France), had it not been for an injury. At the last minute, Wasiewicz was replaced by Ewald Dytko.

Wasiewicz fought in the Invasion of Poland. After Poland's defeat, he escaped to Hungary. From there, moved to France and then to England, where he fought in General Stanisław Maczek's First Polish Armoured Division. In late 1944 and early 1945, he fought in France, Belgium and Netherlands, in a famous 1st Polish Infantry Battalion "Bloody Shirts". In recognition of extraordinary service, Wasiewicz was honored with highest orders, including the Belgian Order of Léopold.

Until 1946, he served in the occupation forces in Germany. Then he moved to England, and in 1949 to Argentina, where he died.

References

Sources

See also 
 Polish Roster in World Cup Soccer France 1938

1911 births
1976 deaths
Polish footballers
Poland international footballers
Olympic footballers of Poland
Footballers at the 1936 Summer Olympics
1938 FIFA World Cup players
Polish military personnel of World War II
Pogoń Lwów players
Sportspeople from Lviv
Polish Austro-Hungarians
People from the Kingdom of Galicia and Lodomeria
Association football midfielders
Polish emigrants to Argentina